Elikkala  is a place in Aletty in the southern state of Karnataka, India. It is located in the Aletty post and village Sullia taluk of Dakshina Kannada district in Karnataka.

Demographics
As of 2001 India census, Aletty had a population of coming soon with males and females.

Temples
Shree Sadashiva Temple Aletty, Historical temple

Schools
Govt, High School Aletty Sullia
Higher Primary School Aletty Sullia

Nearby places
Aletty
Mangalore
Puttur
Sullia
Thodikana

How to Reach
Elikkala is 6 km from Sullia (Sullia Aletty, Baddaka, Panathuru, Kerala Road)
Private bus available from Sullia via Aletty
Private jeep facility available from Sullia

Nearest Railway Station
Puttur

Nearest Airport
Mangalore

See also
 Dakshina Kannada
 Districts of Karnataka

References

External links
 http://Dakshina Kannada.nic.in/

Villages in Dakshina Kannada district